Agonochaetia impunctella is a moth of the family Gelechiidae. It is found in the Russian Far East.

References

Moths described in 1920
Agonochaetia
Moths of Asia